Leonard Wood was a professional footballer who played in the Football League for Mansfield Town.

Career
Wood began his career at Huddersfield Town, before signing for Mansfield Town in 1935. At Mansfield, Wood made 46 Football League appearances, scoring three times, before departing in 1938 for Tunbridge Wells Rangers. Wood's exploits at Tunbridge Wells, scoring over 30 goals for the club, led Chelmsford City to sign him in 1939.

References

Association football wing halves
English Football League players
Huddersfield Town A.F.C. players
Tunbridge Wells F.C. players
Mansfield Town F.C. players
Chelmsford City F.C. players
Possibly living people
Year of birth missing
English footballers